Hartlieb or Hartlib is a German surname.

People
Notable people with the surname include:

 Chuck Hartlieb (born 1966), American football player
 Ernie Hartlieb (born 1979), American ice hockey player 
 Geoff Hartlieb (born 1993), American baseball player
 Johannes Hartlieb ( 1410–1468), German physician
 Max von Hartlieb-Walsporn (1883–1959), German army officer
 Samuel Hartlib ( 1600 – 1662), East European-born English polymath

Other uses
 The Advice to Hartlib, a treatise on education written by Sir William Petty as a letter to Samuel Hartlib
 Hartlib Circle, a correspondence network set up in Europe by Samuel Hartlib

German-language surnames
Surnames from given names